A Mít (born 27 July 1997) is a Vietnamese footballer of ethnic Degar descent who plays as a midfielder for V.League 1 club Thanh Hóa.

Early life
A Mít was born one of eight children to a poor Degar family of melon farmers in Kon Tum. At the age of just 12 A Mít traveled to Pleiku to join the HAGL – Arsenal JMG Academy. However A Mít's small size and frequent injuries and sicknesses caused him to quit and go back to his families farm. A couple years latter a scout from SHB Đà Nẵng took notice and invited A Mít to the club's academy. A Mít showed impressive improvement and in 2016 made his league debut.

Honours

Club
Đông Á Thanh Hóa
Vietnamese National Cup:
 Third place : 2022

References 

1997 births
Living people
Vietnamese footballers
Association football midfielders
V.League 1 players
SHB Da Nang FC players
People from Kon Tum Province